The term primary servicer refers to companies that monitor and manage loans. The primary servicer of a loan can be the loan originator, the mortgage banker or a third party and maintains direct contact with the borrower. If the loan falls into default or needs special attention, a special servicer would undertake this role.

The role of a primary servicer

 Analysing the borrower’s financial situation for example reviewing financial statements and business plans and monitoring their performance against their business plans.
 Analysing and monitoring the assets on which the loan is secured by regular visits to the property for inspection as well as reviewing lease agreements, management terms and tenant covenant strength.

Mortgage servicing volumes 

The latest Mortgage Bankers Association end of year survey shows the top CMBS servicers and servicing volumes within the industry.

Total C/MF Loans Secured by Collateral OUTSIDE the US as of December 31, 2010

References 

Mortgage